= Francis Kadima =

Kenyan lawyer

Francis Kadima is a Kenyan lawyer.

== Biography ==
Kadima's formative years were spent in Judiciary. He is a managing partner of Kadima & Co. Advocates a successor firm of Omwitsa Wasuna Kadima Advocates which succeeded Omwitsa and Co., Advocates, with the latter having been established in the year 1970 as the first African Legal Practice in Mombasa.

One of Mr. Kadima's offices in Mombasa is in one of Kenya's oldest courthouse, a colonial building with bars still fixed over the office windows. The room is stuffed with legal volumes dating from the British colonial era and yellowing cardboard files. On the wall next to his oak desk, an Obama calendar is prominently displayed.

In terms of representation, Kadima has served as a legal counsel for suspected pirates tried in Kenya. He is also a member of the Kituo Cha Sheria, a NGO formed by Mombasa lawyers that represents underprivileged people in court free of charge. Additionally, Kadima has been admitted to the International Criminal Court list of counsels.
